Växjö United Football Club is a Swedish football club based in Växjö that competes in Division 3. The club has also competed in the Svenska Cupen.

In the past, the club was called Sufstars FC.

Notable players 
  Alexis Bbakka
  Moses Waiswa

References

External links
 
 Växjö United FC at Soccerway

Football clubs in Kronoberg County